Schwotka is a surname. Notable people with the surname include:

 Alexander Schowtka (born 1963), German swimmer
 Peter Schowtka (1945–2022), German politician

Surnames of German origin